Robert Albert "Pat" Newnam (December 10, 1880 – June 20, 1938) was a Major League Baseball first baseman who played in  and  with the St. Louis Browns.

External links

1880 births
1938 deaths
Major League Baseball first basemen
Baseball players from Texas
St. Louis Browns players
San Antonio Bronchos players
Charleston Sea Gulls players
Houston Buffaloes managers
Houston Buffaloes players
Portland Beavers players
Beaumont Exporters players
People from Hempstead, Texas